The Daredevils (a.k.a. Daredevils Of Kung Fu, a.k.a. Magnificent Acrobats) is a 1979 Shaw Brothers film directed by Chang Cheh, starring the Venoms.

It is known internationally by its American title Daredevils Of Kung Fu (as distributed by World Northal). The film has no connection whatsoever to the Shaolin Temple, Shaolin martial arts, nor is there any mention of "Shaolin" throughout the entire film.

Plot

The Venoms (all on the same side), a group of broke street performers take on a corrupt general (Wang Li) who has assumed power by assassinating his superior. The son of the murdered general (Lo Mang), now homeless, turns to his friends to help him get revenge. The smartest of the bunch (Kuo Chui) initially thinks it's a bad idea as the army, led by Wang Li has guns and rifles. Kuo eventually comes up with a successful plan to steal some guns to get revenge but guards arrive before they can get bullets (thus, worthless guns). After Lo Mang decides to go solo, he is killed by Wang Li's kung fu. Kuo, and the other three venoms decide to use brains instead of brawn to take revenge for Lo Mang. Lu Feng poses as a visiting government official with the other venoms as his assistants, and as a peace token offers Wang Li the stolen guns (with Wang Li not knowing they are his guns originally). Wang Li thinks Lu Feng will promote him so he agrees to a fake plan by Lu Feng to go get more guns from a warehouse and send his soldiers to a non-existent battle. Wang Li and his three of his best fighters go to the warehouse but are ambushed by the Venoms as they get revenge for Lo Mang and his father.

Cast
 Philip Kwok - Liang Kuo-jen
 Lu Feng - Fu Chuan-yi
 Lo Mang – Yang Tau-Ying
 Chiang Sheng – Chin Feng
 Wang Li  - General Han Pei-tsang
 Sun Chien – Mr. Hsin
 Yu Tai Ping
 Chan Shen - Chief of Staff
 Cho Tat-wah - Leung's Father
 Wang Han Chen		
 Yang Hsiung

External links

Kung fu films
Hong Kong martial arts films
Shaw Brothers Studio films
1979 films
1979 martial arts films
1970s martial arts films
Films directed by Chang Cheh
1970s Hong Kong films